The painted big-eared mouse (Auliscomys pictus) is a species of rodent in the family Cricetidae. It is found in Bolivia and Peru, and possibly Chile.

References

Auliscomys
Mammals of Bolivia
Mammals of Peru
Mammals described in 1884
Taxa named by Oldfield Thomas
Taxonomy articles created by Polbot